Ruishton is a village and civil parish in Somerset, England, situated on the River Tone and A358 road  east of Taunton in the Somerset West and Taunton district.  The village has a population of 1,473. The parish includes the hamlet of Henlade.

History
The name Ruishton means settlement where rushes grow.

Cambria Farm which is now the site of a Park and ride close to Junction 25 of the M5 motorway was the site of a Bronze and Iron Age settlement and Roman farm.

The tithings of Ruishton and Henlade formed part of the manor of Taunton Deane from the 9th century. The parish of Ruishton was part of the Taunton Deane Hundred.

Henlade House was built between 1805 and 1815, by an unidentified Italian architect for John Proctor Anderdon. It has been designated as a Grade II* listed building. During World War II, it was host to a private school from Folkestone who were evacuated here. It is now a hotel.

Ruishton House dates from 1893. It was built by a Mr Spiller for Stuart Somerville. The Somerville family owned the paperworks at Creech St Michael, and there is a memorial to them in the Church of St George.

Governance
The parish council has responsibility for local issues, including setting an annual precept (local rate) to cover the council's operating costs and producing annual accounts for public scrutiny. The parish council evaluates local planning applications and works with the local police, district council officers, and neighbourhood watch groups on matters of crime, security, and traffic. The parish council's role also includes initiating projects for the maintenance and repair of parish facilities, as well as consulting with the district council on the maintenance, repair, and improvement of highways, drainage, footpaths, public transport, and street cleaning. Conservation matters (including trees and listed buildings) and environmental issues are also the responsibility of the council.

The village falls within the non-metropolitan district of Somerset West and Taunton, which was established on 1 April 2019. It was previously in the district of Taunton Deane, which was formed on 1 April 1974 under the Local Government Act 1972, and part of Taunton Rural District before that. The district council is responsible for local planning and building control, local roads, council housing, environmental health, markets and fairs, refuse collection and recycling, cemeteries and crematoria, leisure services, parks, and tourism.

Somerset County Council is responsible for running the largest and most expensive local services such as education, social services, libraries, main roads, public transport, policing and  fire services, trading standards, waste disposal and strategic planning.

The appropriate electoral ward is called 'Ruishton and Creech'. The ward stretches from Thornfalcon in the south, through Creech St. Michael to Adsborough. The total population of this ward is 4,008.

It is also part of the Taunton Deane county constituency represented in the House of Commons of the Parliament of the United Kingdom. It elects one Member of Parliament (MP) by the first past the post system of election.

Religious sites
The Norman parish Church of St George was built in the 14th and 15th centuries and has been designated as a grade I listed building. In the churchyard is the remains of a 15th-century cross.

References

External links

 Village web site

Villages in Taunton Deane
Civil parishes in Somerset